Don L. Wulffson (born 1943 in Los Angeles, California) is the author of the books Soldier X and Before Columbus: Early Voyages to the Americas.

References

1943 births
Living people